San Paolo Cervo is a former comune (municipality) in the Province of Biella in the Italian region Piedmont, located about  northeast of Turin and about  northwest of Biella.  From 1 January 2016 San Paolo Cervo, along with Quittengo, was absorbed by the neighbouring municipality of Campiglia Cervo.

References

Former municipalities of the Province of Biella
Frazioni of the Province of Biella
Cities and towns in Piedmont
Campiglia Cervo